3.V is the third studio album by Zebra. It was released in 1986 on Atlantic Records. This album marked a new, more AOR radio-friendly direction,  attempting a commercial comeback for the group after the 1984 flop No Tellin' Lies. This bid would prove unsuccessful as the record company did little in the way of promotion, and the album failed to chart – it would be the group's last studio album for Atlantic before being dropped from the label. The album went out-of-print in 1990. It was reissued in 2007 as an import paired on one CD with No Tellin' Lies, another deleted title, as the stand-alone compact disc version became a scarce collector's item in the meantime. 3.V, along with the first two Zebra albums, was reissued on CD again in Japan in 2013. In 2016 Rock Candy Records reissued the album on CD.

Reception 
Some critics have heralded this to be the best Zebra album, even better than their debut. Doug Stone from AllMusic gave the album 4.5 stars, saying "3.V has that certain something extra: more than an album, 3.V opens the mind of an unheralded genius." Classic Rock Review wrote that the album was "plagued by clusters of both mediocrity as well as pure brilliance" but "includes some of the band's finest work".

Track listing 
All tracks were written by Randy Jackson

Personnel
Randy Jackson – guitar, lead vocals, Prophet 5 synthesizer
Felix Hanemann – bass, backing vocals, keyboards
Guy Gelso – drums, backing vocals, percussion

Production
Arranged & Produced by Randy Jackson & Zebra
Stephen Benben, Jamie Chaleff, Ken Collins, Ellen Fitton, Ira McLaughlin, Dan Nash - engineers
Mitchell Frondelli, Dan Nash – mixing

References

Zebra (band) albums
1986 albums
Atlantic Records albums